Ghanashyam Hemlata Vidya Mandir (G.H.V.M.) school is a senior secondary English-medium school located in Jharsuguda, Odisha. Two G.H.V.M campuses are present, one in the Jharsuguda District of Odisha, and the other in Puri, Konark.

G.H.V.M. is a progressive co-educational English medium school named after its founder-cum-chairman Shri Ghanashyam Jena and his wife SMT Hemalata Devi. Financial support came from to the founder, the FCI workers’ union, the petroleum products handlers and Careers Employees Union. This school is one of the 21,405 C.B.S.E affiliated schools in India.

History
The first building was established on a 13-acre site in 1995. The school functions under the direction of Pabitra Mohan Behera (secretary) and the managing committee of the GHVM Society (registered under the Society Registration Act no. NO.S/27929 of 1995, Delhi). Affiliation No. 1530088. Classes serve up to 10th standard. The school planned to offer senior secondary education in 2016, School Reg. No B53014.

See also
 Ghanashyama Hemalata Institute of Technology and Management
 Ghanashyam Hemlata Vidya Mandir, Puri

References

External links 
GHVM Cuttack
GHVM Jharsuguda

Jharsuguda district
High schools and secondary schools in Odisha
1995 establishments in Orissa
Educational institutions established in 1995